Llywelyn, Llewelyn or Llewellyn is a name of Welsh language origins. See Llywelyn (name) for the name's etymology, history and other details.

As a surname

Arts
Carmen Llywelyn, American actress and photographer
Chris Llewellyn (poet), American poet
David Llewellyn (author) (born 1978), Welsh author of Eleven
Desmond Llewelyn (1914–1999), Welsh actor who played Q in several James Bond films
Dylan Llewellyn, English actor
Grace Llewellyn, American author of several books on homeschooling
Kate Llewellyn, (born 1936), Australian poet
Morgan Llywelyn (born 1937), U.S.-born Irish historical author
Olivia Llewellyn (born 1980), English actress
Patricia Llewellyn (1962–2017), British television producer
Richard Llewellyn (1906–1983), English author of Welsh descent
Robert Llewellyn (born 1956), English actor, presenter, and writer
Roddy Llewellyn (born 1947), British landscape gardener, author, and television presenter
Roger Llewellyn, British actor
Sam Llewellyn (born 1948), British author of literature for children and adults
William Llewellyn (painter) (1858–1941), English painter and President of the Royal Academy

Politics
Evan Henry Llewellyn (1847–1914), British politician
Karl Llewellyn (1893–1962), American jurisprudential scholar
Royce R. Lewellen, California Superior Court judge

Sports
Bert Llewellyn (1939–2016), English footballer
Carl Llewellyn (born 1965), Jockey and trainer
Charlie Llewellyn (1876–1964), first non-white South African Test cricketer
Chris Llewellyn (born 1979), Welsh footballer
Gareth Llewellyn (born 1969), Welsh rugby union footballer
Harry Llewellyn (1911–1999), British equestrian champion
Steve Llewellyn (1924–2002), Welsh rugby league footballer
Willie Llewellyn, (1878–1973) Welsh international rugby captain

Other
David Llewellyn (disambiguation)
Doug Llewelyn (born 1938), original host of The People's Court
John Dillwyn Llewelyn (1810–1882), Welsh botanist and photographer
Paula Llewellyn, Jamaican lawyer 
Peter Rodney Llewellyn (born 1947), English businessman and con artist
Reese J. Llewellyn (c. 1862–1936), Welsh-born American businessman

As a given name

Middle Ages
Ordered chronologically
Llywelyn ap Merfyn (died 942), king of Powys
Llywelyn Aurdorchog (c. 1005–1065) Welsh war-chief, lord of Ial.
Llywelyn ap Seisyll (died 1023), king of Gwynedd and Deheubarth
Llywelyn the Great (Llywelyn Fawr; Llywelyn ab Iorwerth; c. 1173–1240), Prince of Gwynedd and ruler of most of Wales
Llywelyn Fawr ap Maredudd, early 13th century lord of Meirionnydd
Llywelyn ap Gruffudd (c. 1228–1282), last crowned Welsh Prince of Wales
Llywelyn ap Maredudd ap Llywelyn ap Maredudd ap Cynan (died 1263), minor Welsh prince, last vassal lord of Meirionnydd
Llywelyn ap Dafydd (c. 1260–1288), heir to the Welsh crown imprisoned in 1283
Llywelyn Bren (died 1317), nobleman who led a Welsh rebellion in 1316
Llywelyn ap Gruffydd Fychan (1341–1401), Welsh landowner executed for assisting Owain Glyndŵr's escape from English forces

Arts
Llywelyn Goch ap Meurig Hen (c. 1350–1390), Welsh-language court poet
Llywelyn ab y Moel (died 1440), Welsh-language poet and rebel
Llewelyn Wyn Griffith (1890–1977), Welsh novelist
Llewelyn Powys (1884–1939), British writer
Llywelyn Siôn (c. 1540–1615), Welsh-language poet
Llewellyn Xavier (born 1945), Saint Lucian artist

Military
Llewellyn Chilson (1920–1981), highly decorated United States Army master sergeant
Llewellyn Garrish Estes (1843–1905), American Civil War soldier awarded the Medal of Honor
Llewellyn F. Haskell (1842–1929), Union Army officer
Llewelyn Alberic Emilius Price-Davies (1878–1965), British soldier and recipient of the Victoria Cross

Politics
Llewellyn Atherley-Jones (1851–1929), British politician and judge
Llewellyn Edwards (born 1935), Australian politician and chancellor of the University of Queensland
Llewellyn Powers (1836–1908), member of the US House of Representatives from Maine
Llewellyn H. Rockwell, Jr. (born 1944), American libertarian political commentator
Llewellyn Thomas Smith (Llew Smith) (born 1944), Welsh politician
Llewellyn Thompson (1904–1972), American diplomat
Llewellyn Turner (1823–1903), Welsh politician
Llywelyn Williams (1911–1965), Welsh politician

Sports
Llewelyn Alan Curbishley (born 1957), English football manager
Llewellyn Herbert (born 1977), South African athlete
Llewelyn Kenrick (1847–1933), Welsh international footballer
Llewellyn Starks (born 1967), American long jumper

Other
Llewellyn John Montfort Bebb (1862–1915), British academic
Llewellyn Henry Gwynne (1863–1957), first Bishop of Egypt and Sudan
Llewelyn Lewellin (1798–1878), British cleric and university educator
Llewellyn Ivor Price (1905–1980), Brazilian paleontologist
Llewellyn Thomas, British physicist and applied mathematician
Llewellyn Vaughan-Lee (born 1953), British Sufi mystic and author
Llewelyn Williams (disambiguation)
Llewellyn Woodward (1890–1971), British historian

As a patronymic
Dafydd ap Llewelyn (disambiguation)

Fictional characters
Louie Duck, full name Llewellyn Louis Duck, a Disney cartoon character, one of Donald Duck's nephews
Llewelyn Moss, from Cormac McCarthy's novel No Country for Old Men and its film adaption of the same name
Llewelyn, a young archer in the video game Valkyrie Profile
Llewellyn, an anthropomorphic dragon from the webcomic Ozy and Millie
Bronwen "Stormy" Llewellyn, in the novel Odd Thomas

See also
W. Llewelyn Williams (1867–1922), Welsh journalist, lawyer and politician
Lewellyn Lew Christensen (1909–1984), American ballet dancer, choreographer and director
Llewellin, a surname
Fluellen, a Welshman from Shakespeare's history Henry V

Welsh-language surnames